Eugenia discors is a species of plant in the family Myrtaceae endemic to Peru.

References

Endemic flora of Peru
discors
Vulnerable plants
Taxonomy articles created by Polbot